Sebastián Ariel Penco (born 22 September 1983 in Morón, Buenos Aires) is an Argentine footballer who currently plays as a forward for San Martín SJ.

External links
 Profile & Statistics at Guardian's Stats Centre
 Apertura 2004 Statistics at Terra.com.ar 
 
 
 Ascenso MX Profile

1983 births
Living people
Argentine footballers
Argentine expatriate footballers
Association football forwards
Sportspeople from Buenos Aires Province
Everton de Viña del Mar footballers
Xanthi F.C. players
Nueva Chicago footballers
Club Almirante Brown footballers
Club Atlético Independiente footballers
Racing Club de Avellaneda footballers
Deportivo Español footballers
Aldosivi footballers
Club Almagro players
Once Caldas footballers
San Martín de San Juan footballers
Atlético San Luis footballers
Murciélagos FC footballers
Club Atlético Sarmiento footballers
Sport Boys footballers
Chilean Primera División players
Argentine Primera División players
Primera Nacional players
Super League Greece players
Categoría Primera A players
Ascenso MX players
Peruvian Primera División players
Argentine expatriate sportspeople in Chile
Argentine expatriate sportspeople in Greece
Argentine expatriate sportspeople in Colombia
Argentine expatriate sportspeople in Mexico
Argentine expatriate sportspeople in Peru
Expatriate footballers in Chile
Expatriate footballers in Greece
Expatriate footballers in Colombia
Expatriate footballers in Mexico
Expatriate footballers in Peru